The 2012 Western and Southern Open (known as such for sponsorship reasons) was a tennis tournament played on outdoor hard courts.  It was the 111th edition (for the men) and the 84th (for the women) of the Cincinnati Masters, and was part of the ATP World Tour Masters 1000 of the 2012 ATP World Tour, and of the WTA Premier 5 tournaments of the 2012 WTA Tour. The tournament was held at the Lindner Family Tennis Center in Mason, Ohio, United States, from August 11 to August 19, 2012. Roger Federer and Li Na won the singles titles.

Points and prize money

Point distribution

Prize money

ATP singles main-draw entrants

Seeds
The following players were seeded in the main singles draw, following the ATP rankings of August 6, 2012:

Other entrants
The following players received wild cards into the main singles draw:
  Brian Baker
  James Blake
  Lleyton Hewitt
  Sam Querrey

The following players received entry from the singles qualifying draw:
  Ivan Dodig
  Fabio Fognini
  Jesse Levine
  Paul-Henri Mathieu
  Marinko Matosevic
  Sergiy Stakhovsky
  Lu Yen-hsun

The following players received entry as lucky losers:
  Jérémy Chardy
  Alejandro Falla

Withdrawals
  Nicolás Almagro (shoulder injury)
  Juan Carlos Ferrero (foot injury)
  John Isner (back injury)
  Gaël Monfils (knee injury)
  Rafael Nadal (knee injury)
  Gilles Simon (shoulder injury)
  Jo-Wilfried Tsonga (knee injury)
  Fernando Verdasco (wrist injury)

Retirements
  Janko Tipsarević (virus)
  Nikolay Davydenko

ATP doubles main-draw entrants

Seeds

 Rankings are as of August 6, 2012

Other entrants
The following pairs received wildcards into the doubles main draw:
  Brian Baker /  Rajeev Ram
  James Blake /  Sam Querrey

Retirements
  Juan Mónaco (toe injury)
  Janko Tipsarević (virus)

WTA singles main-draw entrants

Seeds

Other entrants
The following players received wild cards into the main singles draw:
  Camila Giorgi
  Sloane Stephens
  Venus Williams

The following players received entry from the singles qualifying draw:
  Akgul Amanmuradova
  Kiki Bertens
  Eleni Daniilidou
  Casey Dellacqua
  Andrea Hlaváčková
  Sesil Karatantcheva
  Madison Keys
  Vania King
  Johanna Larsson
  Bethanie Mattek-Sands
  Urszula Radwańska
  Yaroslava Shvedova

The following players received entry as lucky losers:
  Tímea Babos
  Anna Tatishvili

Withdrawals
  Ana Ivanovic (right foot injury)
  Kaia Kanepi (achilles heel injury) 
  Svetlana Kuznetsova (knee injury) 
  Sabine Lisicki (left abdominal sprain)
  Monica Niculescu (hand injury) 
  Flavia Pennetta (wrist injury) 
  Andrea Petkovic (knee injury) 
  Maria Sharapova (stomach virus) 
  Vera Zvonareva (illness)

Retirements
  Dominika Cibulková (right elbow injury)
  Christina McHale (gastrointestinal illness)
  Tamira Paszek (migraine)
  Nadia Petrova (dizziness)
  Yaroslava Shvedova (heat illness)

WTA doubles main-draw entrants

Seeds

1 Rankings are as of August 6, 2012

Other entrants
The following pairs received wildcards into the doubles main draw:
  Eleni Daniilidou /  Peng Shuai
  Jelena Janković /  Shahar Pe'er
The following pairs received entry as alternates:
  Sofia Arvidsson /  Jill Craybas
  Darija Jurak /  Katalin Marosi

Withdrawals
  Nadia Petrova (dizziness)
  Yaroslava Shvedova (heat illness)

Retirements
  Dominika Cibulková (right elbow injury)
  Peng Shuai (right shoulder injury)

Finals

Men's singles

 Roger Federer defeated  Novak Djokovic, 6–0, 7–6(9–7)
 It was Roger Federer's 5th title in Cincinnati making him the only player in history ever to win this tournament five times. Federer won the event without dropping serve throughout the tournament.

Women's singles

 Li Na defeated  Angelique Kerber, 1–6, 6–3, 6–1
 It was Li Na's first title of the year and sixth of her career.

Men's doubles

 Robert Lindstedt /  Horia Tecău defeated  Mahesh Bhupathi /  Rohan Bopanna, 6–4, 6–4

Women's doubles

 Andrea Hlaváčková /  Lucie Hradecká defeated  Katarina Srebotnik /  Zheng Jie, 6–1, 6–3

References

External links
 
 Association of Tennis Professionals (ATP) tournament profile

 
2012 ATP World Tour
2012 WTA Tour
2012
2012 in sports in Ohio
August 2012 sports events in the United States